William Duke, Jr. (April 11, 1883 – July 20, 1956) was an American lawyer, businessman, and politician from New York.

Life 
Duke was born on April 11, 1883 in Scio, New York, the son of William Duke, Sr. He graduated from Wellsville High School in 1900, Phillips Exeter Academy in Andover, Massachusetts in 1902, and Cornell Law School in 1905. While at Cornell, he was a member of Delta Chi.

While Duke was admitted to the bar in 1905, he initially worked in business. He was a manager of Oak Duke Lumber Company in Wellsville, a director of the Wellsville First National Bank, a director of the Wellsville Upholstering Company, and a director of the Wellsville Business Men's Association.

In 1915, Duke was elected to the New York State Assembly as a Republican, representing Allegany County. He served in the Assembly in 1916, 1917, 1918, 1919, 1920, 1921, 1922, and 1923.

In 1918, Duke became a practicing attorney. He served as Village Attorney from 1929 to 1943, when he was named second director of the Pari-mutuel Revenue by the New York State Department of Taxation and Finance. He also served as a justice of the peace.

In 1909, Duke married Ruby Clary. Their children were William, George L., and John. He was a member of the Methodist Church and a Freemason.

Duke died at Jones Memorial Hospital on July 20, 1956. He was buried in Woodlawn Cemetery.

References

External links 

 The Political Graveyard
 William Duke, Jr. at Find a Grave

1883 births
1956 deaths
People from Wellsville, New York
Phillips Academy alumni
Cornell Law School alumni
20th-century American politicians
New York (state) lawyers
20th-century American lawyers
Republican Party members of the New York State Assembly
American justices of the peace
Methodists from New York (state)
American Freemasons
Burials in New York (state)